The Fell system was the first third-rail system for railways that were too steep to be worked by adhesion on the two running rails alone. It uses a raised centre rail between the two running rails to provide extra traction and braking, or braking alone. Trains are propelled by wheels or braked by shoes pressed horizontally onto the centre rail, as well as by the normal running wheels.  Extra brake shoes are fitted to specially designed or adapted Fell locomotives and brake vans, and for traction the locomotive has an auxiliary engine powering horizontal wheels which clamp onto the third rail. The Fell system was developed in the 1860s and was soon superseded by various types of rack railway for new lines, but some Fell systems remained in use into the 1960s. The Snaefell Mountain Railway still uses the Fell system for (emergency) braking, but not for traction.

History 

The Fell system was designed, developed and patented by British engineer John Barraclough Fell. The first test application was alongside the Cromford and High Peak Railway's cable-hauled incline at Whaley Bridge in Derbyshire, England, in 1863 and 1864.

These tests attracted the attention of the French Government, which conducted its own tests on the slopes of Mont Cenis in 1865. As a result, the Mont Cenis Pass Railway was built by a British company as a temporary connection between France and Italy whilst the tunnel under the Alpine pass was being built; shortening the transit time for mail from Britain and France to Italy and beyond.

List of Fell railways 

The following railways have used the Fell system. Of these, the only one still in operation is the electrified Snaefell Mountain Railway on the Isle of Man, which occasionally uses the centre rail for braking only; the cars are all now equipped with rheostatic braking, which meets all normal braking needs. The only surviving Fell locomotive, New Zealand Railways H 199, is preserved at the Fell Locomotive Museum, Featherston, New Zealand, near the site of the Rimutaka Incline.

France
The Chemin de Fer du Puy-de-Dôme at Clermont-Ferrand opened in 1907 and closed in 1926. It used compressed air to force the wheels against the centre rail.

Brazil
The Estrada de Ferro Cantagalo (Cantagalo railway) from Niterói to Nova Friburgo opened in 1873. Brazil's first mountain railway, of  gauge, re-used some of the equipment from the Mont Cenis Pass Railway, and continued in operation until the 1960s.

Isle of Man
 The Snaefell Mountain Railway opened in 1895.  It uses electric railcars, with a Fell rail for braking.

Italy 

 See France.  Some characteristics of the Mont Cenis Pass Railway include:
  gauge – the gauge in English speaking world is sometimes quoted as 3' 7.5", etc.
 Steepest gradient 1 in 12 (8.3%)
 Gradient where Fell grip system was deemed to be needed 1 in 25 (4.0%)
 Climb 
 Sharpest curve  
 Since there were breaks-of-gauge at either end of the Fell railway, it is not known if ordinary standard gauge rolling stock were needed.
 Length of line .
 Length of Fell section .

New Zealand
 
 The Rewanui Incline on the West Coast of the South Island used a Fell rail for braking from its opening in 1914 to 1966. It closed in 1985.
 The Rimutaka Incline on the Wairarapa Line near Featherston in the North Island opened in 1878 and closed in 1955.  It was replaced by the Rimutaka tunnel. The Fell Engine Museum in Featherston houses the sole preserved Fell locomotive (NZR H class).  
 The Roa Incline on the West Coast of the South Island used a Fell rail for braking from its opening in 1909. It closed in 1960.
 The Kaikorai Cable Car which ran from Dunedin to the Kaikorai Valley used an off-centre Fell rail for braking.
  Funicular railway
 The Wellington Cable Car used a Fell rail for emergency braking from its opening in 1902 until 1978, when it was upgraded.
 unknown gauges
Price's Bush Tramway near Akatarawa.
Charming Creek Tramway near Ngakawau.
 Several bush tramways used Fell rails for braking.

Renewals 
 Ten kilometres of new Chinese manufactured Fell rail was expected to be delivered to the Snaefell Mountain Railway in December 2006 for track-laying between the 2006 and 2007 seasons (Railway Magazine, February 2007).

See also 
 Rack railway
 In 1873, Henry Handyside of Nelson, New Zealand was reported to have invented a similar rack railway system. He was a nephew of Andrew Handyside of the Britannia Foundry, Derby.

References

Note 
  (this book has sections on the Fell mountain railway system, Mont Cenis Pass Railway and Cantagallo Railway).

External links 
 Fell Centre Rail (description of the working of the Fell system, with pictures)
 A remarkable railway (1926 article) 
 The Fell Engine and the Rimutaka Incline (from the Masterton Library)
 The Cantagallo Railway (page down to Nova Friburgo).

Rail technologies
Mountain railways
1863 introductions